Ein Yahav is a moshav in Israel. Located 100 m below sea level in the northern Arava, 12 km south of Hatzeva and between the Yahav and Nikrot streams, it falls under the jurisdiction of the Central Arava Regional Council.

Etymology
Moshav Ein Yahav is named after the Yahav Spring, located southwest of the moshav.

History

In 1950, an agricultural experimentation station was set up at Ein Yahav by members of Shahal, a movement to settle arid areas of Israel. The name was derived from the Arabic name for the area, Ayn Wiba, and the Roman name—Yahibu. The station was abandoned and on 7 October 1953, Israel Defense Forces veterans settled there. In 1959 a Nahal settlement was established 5 km to the east of the original. In 1962 it was civilianized by senior moshavniks and in 1967 the settlement moved to its current location. Ein-Yahav has an airfield nearby (Airport Code: EIY).

Ein Yahav has developed chocolate-colored peppers that combine the nutritional benefits of red and green peppers.

Archaeology
There is an ancient copper-smelting site near Ein Yahav. A small hill with blackened slopes, covered mainly by crushed copper slag, identify the remains of the smelting devices used at the end of the Early Bronze Age for smelting copper.

References

Moshavim
Nahal settlements
Populated places in Southern District (Israel)
Populated places established in 1962
1962 establishments in Israel